"Pendejo" is a song by Spanish singer Enrique Iglesias. It was released by Sony Music Latin on 17 September 2021 as a single from Iglesias' eleventh studio album Final. This was the first single released by Iglesias without an additional artist on the track since 2013's "Heart Attack".

Music video 
The video was released on 17 September 2021, simultaneous with the release of the album Final. It was directed by Jessy Terrero, who had previously directed the videos for Iglesias' singles "Do You Know? / Dímelo", "Cuando Me Enamoro", "El Perdedor", and "Forgiveness".

Charts

References 

Enrique Iglesias songs
2021 songs
2021 singles